Pete McMahon (born October 15, 1981) is a former American football offensive lineman. He was drafted by the Oakland Raiders in the sixth round of the 2005 NFL Draft. He played college football at Iowa.

McMahon has also been a member of the Cleveland Browns, New York Jets, Jacksonville Jaguars, Chicago Rush, New York Dragons and New England Patriots.

Early years
McMahon attended Wahlert High School in Dubuque, Iowa, where he played football as an offensive and defensive lineman.

College career
McMahon played at the University of Iowa as a walk-on offensive lineman from 2000 through 2004.

Professional career

Oakland Raiders
McMahon was drafted by the Raiders in the sixth round of the 2005 NFL Draft. He suffered a knee injury in the team's 2005 training camp and was waived/injured on August 29, 2005, cleared waivers, and was placed on injured reserve on September 1, 2005. He was then released from the injured reserve with an injury settlement the same day.

Cleveland Browns
On September 5, 2005, McMahon was signed to the Browns' practice squad, where he stayed through the 2005 season. He was re-signed to a future contract on January 2, 2006, but was waived on July 21, 2006.

New York Jets
McMahon was signed by the Jets on July 27, 2006, and waived on August 27, 2006.

First stint with Jaguars
The Jaguars signed McMahon to their practice squad on December 12, 2006. He was re-signed to a future contract on January 2, 2007 and assigned to NFL Europa as a member of the Hamburg Sea Devils for their 2007 season. He was waived by the Jaguars on September 1, 2007.

New York Dragons
McMahon was signed by the New York Dragons of the Arena Football League on December 21, 2007 and waived on January 14, 2008.

Second stint with the Jaguars
McMahon was signed to a future contract by the Jaguars on January 22, 2008, but was waived by the team on July 25, 2008.

New England Patriots
McMahon was signed by the Patriots on July 30, 2008, but was waived on August 13, 2008.

Third stint with the Jaguars
On August 14, 2008, the Jaguars signed McMahon once again. He was waived by the team on August 30, 2008.

External links
Just Sports Stats
Iowa Hawkeyes bio
Jacksonville Jaguars bio
New England Patriots bio

1981 births
Living people
Sportspeople from Dubuque, Iowa
American football offensive tackles
American football offensive guards
Iowa Hawkeyes football players
Oakland Raiders players
Cleveland Browns players
New York Jets players
Jacksonville Jaguars players
Hamburg Sea Devils players
Chicago Rush players
New York Dragons players
New England Patriots players